Mark Laurence James Blatchly (born 1960) is an English organist and composer.

Born in Shepton Mallet, Blatchly was an organ scholar at St Paul's Cathedral. He was assistant organist at Gloucester Cathedral, and organist at St Edmundsbury Cathedral, as well as a music teacher and organist at Charterhouse until his retirement in 2018.

His best known work is a setting of For the Fallen, which has been recorded by several cathedral choirs for Remembrance services.

As organist, he has been recorded both in solo roles and as part of larger ensembles.

References

1960 births
Living people
English classical composers
English classical organists
British male organists
20th-century English composers
21st-century organists
20th-century British male musicians
21st-century British male musicians
Male classical organists